Leo Louis Dickerman  (October 31, 1896 in De Soto, Missouri – April 30, 1982 in Atkins, Arkansas) was a pitcher in Major League Baseball. He pitched for the  Brooklyn Robins during the 1923 and 1924 baseball seasons and the St. Louis Cardinals in 1924 and 1925.

External links

1896 births
1982 deaths
Baseball players from Missouri
Major League Baseball pitchers
Brooklyn Robins players
St. Louis Cardinals players
Little Rock Travelers players
Memphis Chickasaws players
Oakland Oaks (baseball) players
Syracuse Stars (minor league baseball) players
Shreveport Sports players
Sacramento Senators players
Waco Cubs players
People from De Soto, Missouri